Dustin Schuetter (born May 14, 1984) is an American actor, producer, director and screenwriter.

Career 

Shortly after arriving in Los Angeles, Dustin found work with Emmy-nominated Director Gil Junger, who directed the film 10 Things I Hate About You, as well as TV series Kyle XY, Ellen and Greek. He has also worked alongside Oscar-Nominated and award-winning actress Sally Kirkland. Since that time, Schuetter has worked steadily in Hollywood, appearing in seven films and three pilots (mostly leads).

In 2009, Schuetter formed Dark Horse Pictures, with co-producer and partner Bernadette F. Dugas, which would later be changed to Aria Cinema Relic. That same year he wrote, produced, directed and played the role of Jackson Dedd in his first dark comedy Dedd Brothers. During that time, Carlucci Weyant was called in to play the role of Randy Dedd. Schuetter, Dugas and Weyant partnered up to produce his next film, Samuel Bleak.

In 2010, Schuetter went on to write, direct, produce and play the lead in his film Samuel Bleak starring Debora Kara Unger, David Zayas, Jamie Murray, Keith David, James Russo, Robert Miano, K Callan and co-producer Carlucci Weyant. Samuel Bleak premiered at Cinequest Film Festival in the historic California Theatre on March 5, 2011, showed at the Sarasota Film Festival and competed at the First Santa Catalina Film Festival in Catalina, CA. Samuel Bleak has also been nominated for the 2011 Voice Award which is sponsored by the U.S. Department of Health and Human Services, Substance Abuse and Mental Health Services Administration (SAMHSA), and Center for Mental Health Services.  The Voice Awards honor leaders who have done exemplary work promoting the social inclusion of individuals with behavioral health problems.

Filmography

Current 

To date, Schuetter has penned six screenplays, three of which are in pre-production. While currently living in Los Angeles, he often travels to his home state of Louisiana to do film work at Aria Relic Studios, a film production company owned by Schuetter and Bernadette F. Dugas.

Sources 

 Cinequest World Premiere
 Thibodaux Filmmaker
 CQ Central
 Weyant and Schuetter Join Forces
 Thibodaux Native
 Directors Discuss Challenges
 Dark Horse Productions
 Cinequest Film Festival
Resurrection Mary
Samuel Bleak Goes Cajun

External links

Aria Relic Cinema

Living people
1984 births
People from Thibodaux, Louisiana